Thai-Chinese International School (TCIS; ;) is a private, non-profit day school in Bang Phli District, Samut Prakan Province, in the Bangkok Metropolitan Region of Thailand.

The school was founded in 1995 for the Taiwanese and Thai communities. The curriculum includes multilingual education in English, Chinese, and Thai.

History
The Taiwanese Ministry of Education previously oversaw the school and designated it as an overseas Taiwanese school. It removed TCIS from the list on 1 February 2006 since TCIS was unable to conform to Taiwanese curriculum standards.

Accreditation 
Thai-Chinese International School is licensed under by:
 The Private Education Commission of the Thai Ministry of Education
 The Ministry of Education, Republic of China (Taiwan).
 The Western Association of Schools and Colleges (WASC)
 East Asia Regional Council of Overseas Schools (EARCOS)
 International Schools Association of Thailand (ISAT)

Curriculum Overview 
Thai-Chinese International School operates under USA’s Common Core curriculum at all grade levels, and Advanced Placement courses for high school. The Common Core, curriculum used by most states in America, is a set of specific academic standards. These learning goals outline what a student should know and be able to do at the end of each grade.

Students
The students are drawn from many different nationalities. Many of the students in Thai-Chinese International School are Taiwanese or Thai, but there are also American, Canadian, British, Latin American, Japanese, Korean, and Filipino students.

University entry 
Thai-Chinese International School students choose to go to university in many different countries, including the United States, the United Kingdom, Australia, Canada, Taiwan, Japan, South Korea, and Thailand. For past ten years, all graduate from the Thai-Chinese International School were accepted to their chosen university or college. In 2018, Thai-Chinese International School students received over USD 1,000,000 in scholarships.

Cafeteria 
TCIS provides cuisine in Thai, Taiwanese, Western, and other Asian cultures. Other options includes fruit, vegetable juices, and smoothies.

Athletics 
The school has several sports and athletic activities including football, basketball, volleyball, golf, swimming, softball, and weight training. TCIS is a member of, and competes in, the Bangkok International Schools Athletic Conference (BISAC).

References

International schools in the Bangkok Metropolitan Region
Educational institutions established in 1995
Education in Samutprakan province
1995 establishments in Thailand
Buildings and structures in Samut Prakan province
Taiwanese international schools